877 Walküre (prov. designation:  or ) is a dark background asteroid from the inner regions of the asteroid belt, approximately  in diameter. It was discovered on 13 September 1915, by Russian astronomer Grigory Neujmin at the Simeiz Observatory on the Crimean peninsula. The carbonaceous F/C-type asteroid has a rotation period of 17.4 hours and is likely elongated in shape. It was named after the female spirit Valkyrie from Norse mythology, best known from Wagner's opera Die Walküre.

Orbit and classification 

Located in or near the orbital region of the Nysa family, Walküre is a non-family asteroid of the main belt's background population when applying the hierarchical clustering method to its proper orbital elements. It orbits the Sun in the inner asteroid belt at a distance of 2.1–2.9 AU once every 3 years and 11 months (1,432 days; semi-major axis of 2.49 AU). Its orbit has an eccentricity of 0.16 and an inclination of 4° with respect to the ecliptic.

Naming 

This minor planet was named after the Valkyrie a female spirit from Norse mythology. The shield-bearing valkyries decide the fate of warriors in battle, and conduct some of them to Valhalla, the afterlife hall where the fallen heroes are received. Die Walküre (The Valkyrie) is also part of the opera cycle Der Ring des Nibelungen by Richard Wagner (1813–1883), the others being The Rhinegold, Siegfried and the Twilight of the Gods. Asteroids 894 Erda and 890 Waltraut are also named after characters in Wagner's Ring, while 3992 Wagner and 1260 Walhalla are named after the composer and the Walhalla memorial hall of fame, respectively.

Physical characteristics 

In the Tholen classification, Walküre is a dark, carbonaceous F-type asteroid, while in the SDSS-based taxonomy and in the Barucci-taxonomy, it is a common carbonaceous C-type and C0-type asteroid, respectively.

Rotation period 

In February 2011, a rotational lightcurve of Walküre was obtained from photometric observations by astronomer Li Bin at the XuYi Station  of the Purple Mountain Observatory in China. Lightcurve analysis gave a rotation period of  hours with a brightness variation of  magnitude, indicative of an elongated shape.

Poles 

Each modeled lightcurve also determined two spin axes of (68.0°, 58.0°) and (253.0°, 61.0°), as well as (262.0°, 71.0°) and (47.0°, 66.0°) in ecliptic coordinates (λ,β).

Diameter and albedo 

The Collaborative Asteroid Lightcurve Link derives an albedo of 0.0634 and gives a diameter of 38.41 kilometers (identical to IRAS) based on an absolute magnitude of 10.69.

References

External links 
 Lightcurve Database Query (LCDB), at www.minorplanet.info
 Dictionary of Minor Planet Names, Google books
 Asteroids and comets rotation curves, CdR – Geneva Observatory, Raoul Behrend
 Discovery Circumstances: Numbered Minor Planets (1)-(5000) – Minor Planet Center
 
 

000877
Discoveries by Grigory Neujmin
Named minor planets
000877
19150913